American Pool (known as Billiard King in Japan) is a Sports simulation video game released for the PlayStation.

The game offers three game modes. Training mode lets the players learn the controls and techniques of the game while playing in trickshot-style levels. pocket Game lets players play against either the computer or a friend in five different pool games; 9-Ball, 8-Ball, Basic, Rotation and 14-1 Rack. Pool Contest is a tournament mode which they can create their own player and earn special skills.

References

External links

2002 video games
Cue sports video games
PlayStation (console) games
PlayStation (console)-only games
Video games developed in Japan
Mud Duck Productions games
Multiplayer and single-player video games